Simone is a 1918 French silent drama film directed by Camille de Morlhon. It was remade in 1926.

Cast
 Edmond Duquesne
 Armand Tallier 
 Lilian Greuze 
 Simone Genevois as Simone de Sergeac enfant  
 Romuald Joubé 
 Maurice Escande as Michel Mignier 
 Marie-Laure 
 Garay 
 Henri Valbel
 Joly 
 Régnier

References

Bibliography
 Goble, Alan. The Complete Index to Literary Sources in Film. Walter de Gruyter, 1999.

External links 
 

1918 films
French drama films
1918 drama films
French silent feature films
French films based on plays
French black-and-white films
Silent drama films
1910s French films
1910s French-language films